Nikola Gjorgjev (born 22 August 1997) is a footballer who plays as a right winger for Aarau. Born in Switzerland, he plays for the North Macedonia national team.

Club career

Grasshopper Club Zürich
Gjorgjev is a youth exponent from Grasshoppers. He made his Swiss Super League debut at 14 March 2015 against FC Thun. He replaced Yoric Ravet after 77 minutes. He was loaned out to Eredivisie side FC Twente Enschede on a two-year deal in July 2017. As he only got two caps in the first half of that season, he was loaned to FC Aarau in the Swiss Challenge League in February 2018, with an option to buy. This option was not taken at the end of the season and Gjorgjev returned to Grasshoppers at the end of the season.

At Grasshoppers, he became a mainstay in the first squad and eventually became instrumental in securing their promotion back to the Swiss Super League in 2021, with seven goals and ten assists. However, in their first season back in the top Swiss league, he barely got playtime anymore. On 12 February 2022, Gjorgjev moved to Schaffhausen on loan until the end of the season. He quickly established himself in the starting lineup. In 16 games, he supplied four goals and five assists, helping Schaffhausen qualify for the Promotion Play-offs, where they sadly lost to FC Luzern.

FC Aarau
Following his loan spell at Schaffhausen and his subsequent return to Grasshoppers, his contract was not renewed and he instead signed a two-year deal with his former employer FC Aarau.

International career
Born in Switzerland to Macedonian parents, Gjorgjev originally represented various Swiss youth football teams. However, he switched to the Macedonia national football team and made his debut for them in a friendly 3–1 win over Azerbaijan on 29 May 2016.

References

External links
 

1997 births
Living people
Footballers from Zürich
Swiss people of Macedonian descent
Association football wingers
Swiss men's footballers
Switzerland youth international footballers
Macedonian footballers
North Macedonia international footballers
Grasshopper Club Zürich players
FC Twente players
FC Aarau players
FC Schaffhausen players
Swiss Super League players
Eredivisie players
Swiss Challenge League players
Macedonian expatriate footballers
Expatriate footballers in the Netherlands
Macedonian expatriate sportspeople in the Netherlands
Swiss expatriate sportspeople in the Netherlands
Swiss expatriate footballers